Rachel Harvey was a Jersey-registered fishing vessel which, at 9:45 p.m. on 1 October 1999, struck rocks  off Peninnis Head in the Isles of Scilly in stormy seas.  St Mary's Lifeboat and a search-and-rescue Sea King helicopter from RNAS Culdrose attended the scene.  The lifeboat picked up all six crew, but one man was pronounced dead on arrival at St Mary's Hospital.

See also

 List of shipwrecks of the Isles of Scilly

External links
 

Shipwrecks of the Isles of Scilly
Maritime incidents in 1999